Jewish Voice for Peace (JVP; קול יהודי לשלום Kol Yehudi la-Shalom) is a left-wing Jewish activist organization in the United States that supports the Boycott, Divestment and Sanctions campaign against Israel.

Founding, staff, and advisory board
JVP was formed in September 1996. Stefanie Fox is the executive director; as of 2016, there were 27 other staff members. Members of the advisory board include Tony Kushner, Sarah Schulman, Judith Butler, Noam Chomsky, Naomi Klein, and Wallace Shawn.

Positions
JVP opposes the Israeli occupation of the West Bank and Gaza Strip, and criticizes what it describes as the "severe human-rights violations that Israel engages in every day." It "endorses neither a one-state solution to resolving the Israeli–Palestinian conflict, nor a two-state solution". JVP supports the Palestinian right of return while opposing the Law of Return and the Birthright Israel movement. The organization also supports the boycott against Israel through the Boycott, Divestment and Sanctions movement (BDS).

In 2019 JVP declared itself anti-Zionist.

Activities

Blogs
In 2004, JVP published a collection of essays entitled Reframing Anti-Semitism: Alternative Jewish Perspectives. Among the topics it discussed were antisemitism and stereotypes of Jews in modern America. It argued that the Jewish left and critics of Israeli policy had ceded the fight against antisemitism to the Jewish right and that critics of Israel or Israeli policies should not be accused of antisemitism.

BDS advocacy 
According to its website, JVP supports "divestment from and boycotts of companies that profit from Israel's occupation of the West Bank, Gaza, and East Jerusalem. ... The boycott/divestment/sanctions movement (BDS) encompasses a variety of tactics and targets. JVP rejects the assertion that BDS is inherently anti-Semitic, and we encourage discussion both within our own community and outside of it of the growing BDS movement." JVP justifies its support for the movement by arguing that BDS provides a vehicle allowing individuals all over the world in the Jewish diaspora to bring about real change by threatening in their consumer choices to lower the profits of any business that by their activities reinforces Israel's occupation of the Palestinian territories. Gal Beckerman of The Forward wrote that it "is a group that has demonstrated a guerilla-like savvy in staging actions that get its message out to a broader national audience. In its use of BDS, for example, JVP has staked out a position distinct from those who target any and all entities related to Israel, which for many Jews implies a rejection of Israel's very legitimacy. JVP instead targets only entities involved in one way or another with Israel's occupation of the West Bank." JVP's executive director Rebecca Vilkomerson stated: "We do feel connected to the global BDS movement. We consider ourselves a part of it."

During 2004 and 2005, JVP protested against Caterpillar Inc. for selling bulldozers to Israel, and said that Israel's use of the D9 armoured bulldozers in the West Bank and Gaza Strip was a violation of human rights and Caterpillar's business code of conduct. Along with four Christian groups, JVP introduced a shareholder resolution calling on Caterpillar to re-examine its sales of bulldozers to Israel. The resolution was rejected by 97 percent of the votes at the Caterpillar 2005 shareholders' meeting. JVP continued to introduce shareholder resolutions at Caterpillar shareholder meetings every year since 2005. In 2010 the resolution received 20% of the vote.

In June 2010, JVP launched a divestment campaign against the pension fund TIAA-CREF. The petition to divest reads, "We are participants and investors in TIAA-CREF funds who are deeply concerned that TIAA-CREF invests in many companies that profit from Israel's occupation of the Gaza Strip and the West Bank, including East Jerusalem. Some of these companies provide weapons and covert surveillance supplies that maintain the occupation by force. Others take or exploit Palestinian resources, including scarce water and even the land itself. All are profiting from Israel's violations of international law and international human rights standards." The five companies targeted by the campaign are Caterpillar, Elbit, Veolia, Motorola, and Northrop Grumman.

In September 2010, Israeli artists came to JVP asking for US support to an artistic boycott of the theater in the city of Ariel, in the Israeli-occupied territories. JVP drafted a statement that was signed by over 150 theater and film professionals. On the significance of the action, JVP said that it "was the first time such mainstream figures had drawn a line around normalizing settlements which are illegal according to international law, and which constitute one of the main impediments to a lasting peace between Israelis and Palestinians".

In June 2014, when the General Assembly of the Presbyterian Church (USA) voted to divest its stock in Caterpillar, Hewlett-Packard, and Motorola Solutions to protest "the companies' profiting from the Israeli occupation of the Palestinian territories and pressure Israel to withdraw", JVP members attended the church's convention and supported the divestment measure. Rabbi Alissa Wise, a JVP co-director of organizing, told the Presbyterians that to her, divestment "helps Palestinians build their power. So that Israel is convinced, not by force, but by global consensus that something has to change."

On February 20, 2015, JVP published a statement moving from its former position of supporting selective divestment, to a full endorsement of the call from Palestinian civil society for boycott, divestment, and sanctions against Israel until the Israeli government respects the rights of Palestinians. Explaining the change in position, JVP wrote in 2015:

Demonstrations
In 2006, JVP helped organize a demonstration outside a meeting of the American Israel Public Affairs Committee (AIPAC) in Sacramento, California. The stated purpose of the protest was to argue that AIPAC does not represent the views of all American Jews regarding Israel. As part of a coalition of over 100 organizations, JVP participated in the 2011 Move Over AIPAC conference.

On February 25, 2007, JVP was one of twelve groups that sponsored a demonstration in Teaneck, New Jersey, against the sale of homes in Israeli settlements in the West Bank. The organizations said that in the past, such homes were "sold exclusively to Jewish people" and that Palestinians were not allowed to buy them "because of their religion and their ethnicity". The groups said that the home sale, which took place at Congregation Bnai Yeshurun in Teaneck, might violate international law and New Jersey laws against discriminatory sales practices.

The JVP position on the 2008–2009 Israel–Gaza conflict was that Israel's actions were "an opportunistic agenda for short-term political gain at an immense cost in Palestinian lives" which are "illegal and immoral and should be condemned in the strongest possible terms". JVP joined marches and demonstrations condemning Israel in many cities, including Racine, Wisconsin, and Seattle.

The Young Jewish Declaration is a project created by young JVP leaders. Young Jewish and Proud debuted at the 2010 Jewish General Assembly when five of its members disrupted Israeli Prime Minister Benjamin Netanyahu's speech.

Reception
JVP has come under criticism from other Jewish groups that have branded the movement not only as anti-Semitic but also traitorous. According to political scientist Dov Waxman, the anger which JVP's actions and positions arouse in many other American Jewish groups is just one index of a broader polarizing controversy within the Jewish American community at large, whose leaders had hitherto managed to shut out internal disagreements from the public purview. The Anti-Defamation League criticized JVP for what it described as "anti-Israel radicalism" and "questionable tactics" to promote its agenda, describing a 2017 video campaign as "veering dangerously close to repeating anti-Semitic slurs".

The Jewish Bulletin of Northern California wrote in 2003 that "the mainstream Jewish community" viewed "Jewish Voice for Peace as a group of radical Jews who air dirty laundry by criticizing Israel when the Jewish state is under attack. Some go as far as to label the members self-hating Jews."

On January 28, 2007, the Anti-Defamation League (ADL) convened "Finding Our Voice", a conference co-sponsored by more than 50 Jewish organizations for the purpose of discussing the rise in antisemitism. Its co-sponsors represented a wide range of Jewish opinion, including the ADL and AIPAC on the right and Americans for Peace Now and the Jewish Labor Committee on the left. Tikkun and JVP were not invited to co-sponsor the conference. A spokesperson for JVP said, "From our perspective, you cannot get to the roots of anti-Semitism in the progressive movement without honestly addressing the severe human-rights violations that Israel engages in every day. Judging by the lineup, that kind of honest examination is not likely to happen at this conference."

In February 2007, Rabbi Ira Youdovin, executive vice president of the Chicago Board of Rabbis, wrote a column in The Forward about Jewish critics of Israel, and the way in which many Jews and Jewish organizations "squash" such dissent. In his column, Youdovin wrote that "the line separating calumny from legitimate dissent is unclear and ever shifting," but he added that "Jewish Voice for Peace, which supports divestment and is currently circulating a petition urging Congress to heed Jimmy Carter's words, is certainly beyond the pale." Mitchell Plitnick, director of education and policy for JVP, responded by calling Rabbi Youdovin's line "arbitrary" and saying that "Youdovin misrepresents JVP's position" concerning divestment. Plitnick emphasized that JVP supports "selective and targeted divestment that is aimed exclusively at the occupation, not at Israel itself". Plitnick wrote that "most Jews believe that there should be pressure on both Israelis and Palestinians to make peace" and that "JVP advocates nothing more or less than that."

Writing in The Jerusalem Post in 2008, Jon Haber described JVP as an organization that "exists largely to declare anyone accused of anti-Jewish bias 'not guilty' (with a Jewish accent)".

In October 2010, the Anti-Defamation League (ADL) identified JVP as one of the top 10 anti-Israel groups in the United States. In a September 2010 report, the ADL wrote: "While JVP's activists try to portray themselves as Jewish critics of Israel, their ideology is nothing but a complete rejection of Israel. In May 2008, for example, members of JVP protested many of the celebrations of Israel's 60th anniversary that took place around the country, essentially illustrating that they oppose Israel's very existence."

The ADL also took issue with JVP's mission statement which it said "places the onus of resolving the conflict on Israel" and lists a long list of requirements for Israel. "In stark contrast to these detailed requirements, the only stipulation for Palestinians is the cessation of 'suicide bombings and other attacks on Israeli civilians, the report said. JVP responded by saying the ADL was wrong about several key points—among them, that JVP is not anti-Israel or anti-Zionist. JVP also invited its supporters to make financial contributions to JVP in honor of Abraham Foxman, the leader of the ADL.

In February 2011, The New York Times published a piece on JVP activism in the Bay Area that said, "The activists say they are not working against Israel, but against Israeli government policies they believe are discriminatory." In an editor's note, the Times later wrote that one of the article's two authors was a pro-Palestinian advocate and he should not have been allowed to write it.

In March 2011, Brandeis University's Hillel organization voted not to accept the membership bid of the local campus chapter of JVP, citing JVP's association with the larger Boycott, Divestment and Sanctions movement (BDS). The decision, said the group's e-board, was founded on Hillel International's guidelines for inclusion. Upon review of JVP's statement of mission, past and proposed events, Hillel leadership was quoted saying, "While we understand that JVP at Brandeis considers itself a pro-Israel club, based on positions and programming JVP has sponsored, we do not believe that JVP can be included under Hillel's umbrella." 

Leonard Fein, wrote in regards to the tent of Jewish thought and opinion on March 31, 2011, in The Forward, "I remain quite uncomfortable with the notion that JVP should be barred from the communal tent."

In September 2011, Rabbi Doug Kahn, executive director of the San Francisco–based Jewish Community Relations Council, said: "Jewish Voice for Peace routinely allows itself to be used as political cover by organizations promoting anti-Israel boycotts and divestment so that they can claim that they have Jewish backing for their positions, even though JVP represents a tiny fraction of the community." In response, Rabbi Alissa Wise, a national organizer for JVP who co-founded JVP's rabbinical council, speaking on behalf of the JVP, said "we're not responsible for the language used by others," that some "groups do more harm than good" and that she regarded the work done by JVP as "trying to promote self-determination and equality for all people ... a fruition of Jewish values, the path of living a Jewish life".

The Jewish Federations of North America (JFNA) removed Rebecca Vilkomerson, executive director of JVP, and Cecilie Surasky, deputy director of JVP, from its Jewish Community Heroes competition because JVP "is a supporter of the boycott, divestment and sanctions campaign targeting investment in Israel". Joe Berkofsky, JFNA managing director of communications added "our Israel Action Network is working to challenge the boycott, sanctions and divestment movement and other efforts to isolate and weaken the Jewish state. We cannot therefore support a group that seeks to harm Israel through its support for BDS."

In July 2013, J. The Jewish News of Northern California published an article about a report on JVP from NGO Monitor. The article said that NGO Monitor's report "concludes that JVP has 'actively promoted the central dimensions of the political warfare strategy against Israel. The article quoted Yitzhak Santis, chief programs officer at NGO Monitor, as saying "the organization supports or has partnered with groups such as Sabeel, Electronic Intifada, Al-Awda, International ANSWER Coalition, the International Solidarity Movement and Students for Justice in Palestine, all of which label Israel a racist apartheid state, support BDS and, in some cases, support violence against Israelis."

In 2014, Mark LeVine wrote that "Israel's recent assault on Gaza" had helped increase JVP's membership. Beside the Gaza conflict, LeVine wrote, the rise of JVP was "part of a generational shift in the very fabric of Jewish identity", in which "a growing number of Jewish activists now subscribe to the kind of struggles for fundamental rights that defined Jewish American culture in the civil rights era".

Nadia Hijab wrote about JVP's March 2015 national membership meeting in The Nation. She described JVP as a "key player" in a "fast-growing US movement for Palestinian human rights and equality between Palestinians and Israelis". She wrote that J Street is "larger and better-funded" but JVP "is proving to be a real magnet for American Jews who are outraged by Israel's policies and even more by [Israeli Prime Minister Benjamin] Netanyahu's claim to be speaking in their name, and who want to take action".

In 2016, JVP unreservedly endorsed the platform of the Movement for Black Lives (MFBL), which uses the word "genocide" to describe Israel's treatment of the Palestinians. When their endorsement came in for strong criticism from several Jewish organizations, JVP replied that it was not their job to police the wording the MFBL employs to articulate its viewpoint and expressed disappointment at the other organizations for condemning the platform. Jews of Color Caucus, a group with JVP, stated: "we embrace rather than shut down the multiple uses of the term 'genocide' for what it can reveal about our current crises."

In 2017, JVP was criticized for inviting Rasmea Odeh, a former PFLP member convicted by Israeli military courts for her role in the 1969 Jerusalem supermarket bombing that killed Israelis Edward Joffee and Leon Kanner, as a featured speaker in its biennial conference. Odeh was subsequently deported from the United States after pleading guilty to immigration fraud and losing her American citizenship. In June 2017, JVP received sharp criticism from Jewish progressives and members of the LGBTQ community after some of its members disrupted New York's Celebrate Israel Parade, garnering accusations from Jewish Queer Youth (JQY), an organization for Jewish LGBTQ teenagers mainly from Orthodox communities, that the JVP action constituted "an act of homophobia". JVP Deputy Director Alissa Wise called the backlash against its action "opportunistically cruel" and said responses to it relied on "tired, homophobic memes" and were "hyperbolic in the extreme". Later that month, JVP issued a statement that supported the expulsion from the Chicago Dyke March of marchers who carried rainbow flags that included a Star of David, which march organizers said "made people feel unsafe". In July 2017, the Anti-Defamation League criticized JVP for what it described as "anti-Israel radicalism" and "questionable tactics" to promote its agenda. The ADL said JVP engaged in "harassing LGBT groups", shouting down pro-Israeli speakers at events, and praising convicted Palestinian terrorists such as Odeh and Marwan Barghouti.

Joshua Muravchik writes that JVP's positions and activities are "strikingly distinctive" for a self-described Jewish organization, and in his view they are designed "to weaken Israel materially or in reputation."

The political scientist Miriam F. Elman argues that JVP discourse toward Israel has moved past legitimate criticism of Israeli policies as the organization frequently uses anti-Semitic imagery.

Funding
Jewish Voice for Peace is a 501(c)(3) organization under the US Internal Revenue Code. In 2013, JVP received $1.4 million from a variety of sources.

Major donors include:

 Schwab Charitable Fund: $191,450 in 2014
 Rockefeller Brothers Fund: $140,000 in 2015
 Tides Foundation: $49,477 in 2014
 Jewish Communal Fund: $25,100 in 2015
 Firedoll Foundation: $25,000 in 2014
 Vanguard Charitable Endowment Program: $14,500 in 2014
 National Philanthropic Trust: $12,900 in 2013
 Pomegranate Foundation: $10,000 in 2014
 Ben & Jerry's Foundation: $2,500 in 2014

See also

 Breira (organization)
 Brit Tzedek v'Shalom
 European Jews for a Just Peace
 Independent Australian Jewish Voices
 Independent Jewish Voices
 Jews for Justice for Palestinians
 Peace Movement – Israel
 Partners for Progressive Israel
 Ameinu

References

Citations

Bibliography

Books

Articles

External links
 

Jewish anti-occupation groups
Jewish-American political organizations
Jewish anti-Zionism in the United States
Jewish anti-Zionist organizations
Non-governmental organizations involved in the Israeli–Palestinian peace process
Organizations based in Oakland, California
1996 establishments in California